is a Japanese cross-country skier who competed from 1993 to 2006. 

Horigome competed in three Winter Olympics, and he earned his best career finish with a seventh in the 4 x 10 km relay at Nagano in 1998 while earning his best individual finish of 19th in the 30 km event at Lillehammer in 1994.

Horigome's best finish at the FIS Nordic World Ski Championships was 20th in the 50 km event at Val di Fiemme in 2003. His best World Cup finish was seventh in a 10 km event in Switzerland in 2000.

Horigome earned six individual victories in lesser events up to 30 km from 1994 to 2006.

External links 
 
 Olympic 4 x 10 km relay results: 1936–2002 

1974 births
Living people
Japanese male cross-country skiers
Olympic cross-country skiers of Japan
Cross-country skiers at the 1994 Winter Olympics
Cross-country skiers at the 1998 Winter Olympics
Cross-country skiers at the 2002 Winter Olympics
Asian Games medalists in cross-country skiing
Cross-country skiers at the 1999 Asian Winter Games
Cross-country skiers at the 2003 Asian Winter Games
Medalists at the 1999 Asian Winter Games
Medalists at the 2003 Asian Winter Games
Asian Games gold medalists for Japan
Asian Games silver medalists for Japan
Asian Games bronze medalists for Japan
20th-century Japanese people
21st-century Japanese people